David Walker (15 October 1941 – 21 April 2015) was an English professional footballer who played as a central defender for Burnley and Southampton.

He died on 21 April 2015 at the age of 73.

External links 

Dave Walker - An Appreciation (Southampton FC)

References 

1941 births
2015 deaths
People from Colne
English footballers
Association football central defenders
Burnley F.C. players
Southampton F.C. players
English Football League players
Cape Town City F.C. (NFL) players
English expatriate footballers
Expatriate soccer players in South Africa
English expatriate sportspeople in South Africa
National Football League (South Africa) players